Fortun or Fortún may refer to:

People

Surname 
 Antonio Fortún (c. 1800-c. 1860), former Mayor of Ponce, Puerto Rico
 Elena Fortún (1886–1952), a Spanish children's author
 Julia Elena Fortún (1929–2016), a Bolivian historian, anthropologist, folklorist, and ethnomusicologist
 Kim Fortun, an American anthropologist
Lawrence Fortun, a Filipino politician
 Rafael Fortún (1919–1982), a sprinter from Cuba

Given name 
 Fortún Galíndez (fl. 924–972), a Navarrese nobleman
 Fortún Garcés of Pamplona  (died 922), former King of Pamplona
 Fortún Garcés Cajal  (died 1146), a Navarro-Aragonese nobleman and statesman
 Fortún Íñiguez (c. 842), potential co-regent with García Íñiguez of Pamplona
 Fortún Jiménez (count)  (fl. 943–58), former count of Aragon
 Fortún Ochoiz (fl. 1013–1050), a Navarrese nobleman
 Fortún Sánchez (died 1054), a Navarrese nobleman
 Fortún Ximénez (died 1533), a Spanish sailor who led a mutiny near Mexico

Places 
 Fortun (village), a village in Luster, Norway